Sigo Atrevido (English: I'm Still Daring) is the second studio album recorded by Puerto Rican salsa singer Eddie Santiago. The album was released by TH-Rodven in late 1987 and topped the tropical charts throughout the first half of 1988. The album received a Grammy Award nomination for Best Tropical Latin Performance and another nomination for a Lo Nuestro Award for Tropical Album of the Year.

Singles
Four singles were produced from the album that charted on the Hot Latin Tracks.
"Lluvia" (Rain) was the first single released from the album and charted #4 on Hot Latin Tracks. This single became the highest peaking salsa song of the 1980s.
"Insaciable" (Insatiable) was the second single released from the album and charted #34 on the Hot Latin  Tracks.
"Hagamoslo" (Let's Do It) was the third single released from the album and charted #31 on the Hot Latin Tracks.
"Todo Empezo" (It All Started) was the fourth single released from the album and charted #19 on the Hot Latin Tracks.

Track listing
 Lluvia - 4:56
 Insaciable - 4:29
 Hagámoslo - 3:58
 Vida de Amantes - 4:03
 Momento de Amor - 4:50
 Déjame Amarte - 3:58
 Todo Empezó - 4:55
 Cabalgata - 4:05

Chart position

See also
List of number-one Billboard Tropical Albums from the 1980s

References

1987 albums
Eddie Santiago albums